Dark Canyon Wilderness is a designated Wilderness Area in the heart of southeast Utah's canyon country, part of the Bears Ears National Monument. The wilderness is named for its high steep walls that narrow in the lower section so that they block the light in the morning and late afternoon. The roughly horseshoe-shaped wilderness is made up of the upper part of  Dark Canyon and two major tributaries, Woodenshoe Canyon and Peavine Canyon in the Manti-La Sal National Forest. These canyons all descend from pine-covered Elk Ridge northeast of Natural Bridges National Monument. Dark Canyon continues west within a U.S. Bureau of Land Management primitive area that is recommended for wilderness designation. The last  of the main canyon drop steeply through Glen Canyon National Recreation Area into Lake Powell.

On December 28, 2016 President Barack Obama proclaimed the 1.35 million acre Bears Ears National Monument, that includes both the Dark Canyon Wilderness and the adjacent Dark Canyon Primitive Area.

Life zones range from ponderosa pine and aspen-covered high country to desert vegetation in the bottom of Dark Canyon. Wildlife species include mule deer, some mountain lions, black bear and bighorn sheep. This diverse canyon country contains arches, springs, seeps and hanging gardens.

Water sources in Dark Canyon are often widely separated, and some have dried up entirely in recent drought years. Thunderstorms can result in powerful flash floods that scour the canyon streambeds.

Wilderness visitors may see evidence of the Ancestral Puebloan culture, with several ruins of cliff dwellings in the region.

All the trails dropping into the canyons are moderate but they can be difficult, if not impossible, to find and follow until you reach the bottoms of the canyons. Peavine Canyon contains a cherry-stem jeep trail. The Forest Service once recommended closing the area to vehicles but this corridor was kept open as a compromise in the Utah Wilderness Act of 1984.

See also 

National Wilderness Preservation System
List of U.S. Wilderness Areas
Wilderness Act

References

External links 
 
 

Bears Ears National Monument
Bureau of Land Management areas in Utah
Manti-La Sal National Forest
Native American history of Utah
Pre-Columbian cultural areas
Protected areas of San Juan County, Utah
Wilderness areas of Utah
Protected areas established in 1984
1984 establishments in Utah